Sunil Banerjee (19 December 1919 – 2 August 1986) was an Indian cricket umpire. He stood in one Test match, India vs. England, in 1964.

See also
 List of Test cricket umpires
 English cricket team in India in 1963–64

References

1919 births
1986 deaths
Cricketers from Kolkata
Indian Test cricket umpires